Grevillea miniata, commonly known as sandstone grevillea, is a species of flowering plant in the family Proteaceae and is endemic to north-western Australia. It is a spreading to erect shrub or small tree with more or less oblong leaves and bright yellow to orange and bright red flowers with a yellow style.

Description
The lower surface of the leaves is covered with slightly felty hairs.

TaxonomyGrevillea miniata was first formally described in 1918 by William Vincent Fitzgerald in Journal and Proceedings of the Royal Society of Western Australia from specimens he collected in the Lady Forrest Range. The specific epithet (miniata) means "flame scarlet".

Distribution and habitat
This grevillea grows in shrubland or woodland in rocky places or low hills from the southern end of the King Leopold Range to the Bungle Bungle Range in Western Australia and scattered locations in the north of the Northern Territory.

Conservtion statusGrevillea miniata'' is listed as "Priority Four" by the Government of Western Australia Department of Biodiversity, Conservation and Attractions, meaning that it is rare or near threatened.

References

miniata
Eudicots of Western Australia
Flora of the Northern Territory
Proteales of Australia
Plants described in 1918
Taxa named by William Vincent Fitzgerald